Odontelia daphnadeparisae is a species of moth of the family Noctuidae. It is probably endemic to the Levant. It is known only from Israel and Jordan.

Adults are on wing from December to March. There is one generation per year.

External links
 Hadeninae of Israel

Hadeninae
Moths of the Middle East